The 1987 VMI Keydets football team was an American football team that represented the Virginia Military Institute (VMI) as a member of the Southern Conference (SoCon) during the 1987 NCAA Division I-AA football season. In their third year under head coach Eddie Williamson, the team compiled an overall record of 4–7, with a mark of 2–4 in conference play, tying for fifth place in the SoCon.

Schedule

References

VMI
VMI Keydets football seasons
VMI Keydets football